David Fitzgerald Tate (born November 22, 1964) is a former American football defensive back in the National Football League for the Chicago Bears (1988–1992), the New York Giants (1993) and the Indianapolis Colts (1994–1997).  He played college football at the University of Colorado and was drafted in the eighth round of the 1988 NFL Draft.

In 1993 Tate signed with the New York Jets. There exists a football card of him in a Jets uniform (1993 Power #149). However he is never credited with being on the Jets. He played in 14 games for the Giants, starting 1. He was possibly available to the Jets for 2 games? For some reason his stint with the Jets is a mystery.

1964 births
Living people
Players of American football from Denver
American football safeties
Colorado Buffaloes football players
Chicago Bears players
New York Giants players
Indianapolis Colts players